The 1811 New York lieutenant gubernatorial special election was held to fill the unexpired term of the Lieutenant Governor of New York.

Background
Lieutenant Governor John Broome died in August 1810, and the 1777 Constitution provided for new elections if a vacancy occurred either in the Governor's or the Lieutenant Governor's office.

Candidates
The Democratic-Republican Party nominated Mayor of New York City DeWitt Clinton. 

The Federalist Party nominated former Adjutant General of New York Nicholas Fish.

Tammany Hall nominated former Mayor of New York City Marinus Willett.

Results

Sources
Result

See also
New York gubernatorial elections

1811
LtGubernatorial
New York
LtGubernatorial